The 1985 IBF World Championships (World Badminton Championships) were held in Calgary, Canada, from June 10 to June 16, 1985. Following the results of the women's doubles.

Main stage

Section 1

Section 2

Final stage

References

1985 IBF World Championships
IBF